Kaffa (Amharic: ከፋ) was a province on the southwestern side of Ethiopia; its capital city was Bonga. Kaffa is bordered on the west by Sudan, on the northwest by Illubabor, on the north by Walega, on the northeast by Shewa, on the east by Sidamo, and on the southeast by Gamu-Gofa. 

According to legend, ancestors of today's Kaffa people in southwest Ethiopia were the first to cultivate the coffee plant and recognise the energising effect of the coffee beverage.

See also
 Kingdom of Kaffa
 History of Ethiopia

References 

Provinces of Ethiopia
States and territories disestablished in 1995
States and territories established in 1942